Bernt Berntsen Lomeland (1836 – 1900) was a Norwegian school teacher and lay minister who established The Community (Samfundet) in 1890. Born to a farmer in Helleland, outside Egersund, Norway, he worked as a teacher after his confirmation. He later attended a two-year course to formally become a teacher. After this, he got involved with the religious movement, called "the strong believers" in Kristiansand, Norway. First, he worked as a teacher at their school, before he became a preacher. In the 1870s and 1880s he was the editor of several religious journals. He rose to become a leading figure among the strong believers and became a key figure when The Community (Samfundet) was established in 1890. During the church's first decade, he served as pastor and head teacher. His publications is still widely read among members of The Community (Samfundet).

References

1836 births
1900 deaths
Norwegian schoolteachers
People from Eigersund